Byblis liniflora is a species of carnivorous plant in the Byblidaceae family. It is found in Australia, Indonesia, and Papua New Guinea.

Byblis liniflora contains acteoside (verbascoside) as do many other Lamiales.

References

liniflora
Eudicots of Western Australia
Flora of the Northern Territory
Flora of Queensland
Flora of New Guinea
Carnivorous plants of Asia
Least concern flora of Australia
Least concern biota of Queensland
Taxonomy articles created by Polbot